The Taking of Deborah Logan is a 2014 American found footage supernatural horror film, which serves as the feature film directorial debut of Adam Robitel, who co-wrote the screenplay and edited the film with Gavin Heffernan. The film stars Jill Larson, Anne Ramsay and Michelle Ang. Set in Virginia, it tells the story of a documentary crew making a film about Alzheimer's patients who uncover something sinister while documenting a woman who has the disease. The film was produced by Jeff Rice and Bryan Singer and was released on October 21, 2014.

Plot
Mia Medina, Gavin, and Luis are a team of students who want to create a documentary about Deborah Logan, an elderly woman with Alzheimer's disease living with her daughter, Sarah. As the film crew records her daily life, Deborah starts to exhibit increasingly bizarre actions that her personal physician states are normal for someone with an aggressive form of Alzheimer's. However, cameraman Luis begins to notice that her actions defy normal explanations and expresses concern that something supernatural is occurring. Things grow more tense after Luis and Gavin record audio of Deborah speaking in French, talking about sacrifices and snakes. They notice that the line for 337 at her switchboard continually rings; the line belonged to local physician Henri Desjardins, who disappeared after a series of cannibalistic ritualized murders of four young girls. Deborah's behavior becomes so extreme that she is hospitalized for her own safety. Dismayed, Gavin quits the film.

The others discover that Desjardins was supposedly trying to recreate an ancient Monacan ritual that would make him immortal but required the deaths of five girls that recently had their first period. They wonder whether Deborah is possessed by Desjardins. Sarah, Mia and Luis discover that Deborah had unsuccessfully tried to abduct Cara Minetti, a young cancer patient. At the hospital, Harris Sredl, Deborah's friend, visits her and she begs him to kill her. He tries to comply but is knocked out by the entity possessing her. Sarah learns from Harris that years ago, Deborah found out that Desjardins planned to use Sarah as his fifth victim. It had prompted her to murder the doctor before he could accomplish his plan, and she buried his body in the yard. The group finds the body's remains and tries to burn them, but fails.

Deborah succeeds in abducting Cara and taking her to the location where Desjardins had killed his previous victims. After discovering Deborah has gone into the mines, Sheriff Linda Tweed follows behind, only to be killed. Sarah and Mia find Deborah as she is trying to swallow Cara's head in a snake-like manner and manage to burn Desjardins' corpse. Sarah and the re-conscious Deborah reunite. The film then cuts to news footage of reporters stating that Deborah was deemed unfit to stand trial for her crimes and abduction of Cara, her health having deteriorated rapidly in the months following the incident. Cara has overcome her cancer and is celebrating her 10th birthday. As the reporter begins to wrap up the story, Cara turns to the camera and gives a sinister smile.

Cast
 Jill Larson as Deborah Logan
 Anne Ramsay as Sarah Logan
 Michelle Ang as Mia Medina
 Ryan Cutrona as Harris Sredl
 Anne Bedian as Dr. Analisa Nazir
 Brett Gentile as Gavin
 Jeremy DeCarlos as Luis
 Tonya Bludsworth as Linda Tweed
 Julianne Taylor as Cara Minetti
 Kevin A. Campbell as Henri Desjardins
 Jeffrey Woodard as Father Vitali
 David Hains as News Reporter
 Sage Cline as Hospital Security

Production
The filming took place in Charlotte Region, North Carolina and Creative Network Studios. Additional stunt doubles were used in place of Mia, Deborah and others. Vincent Guastini did the special effects.  He said that he was impressed with the script and wanted to work with the filmmakers.  He described his relationship with Robitel as "truly a collaborative effort".  He agreed with Robitel's choice to limit the amount of footage seen of the transformation, as he felt this "added more believability and truth".

Release 
The Taking of Deborah Logan released via electronic sell-through on October 21, 2014 and was followed by releases on video on demand and DVD on November 4, 2014.

Reception
The film holds an 91% approval rating on Rotten Tomatoes, based on reviews from 11 critics, and the average score is 6.40/10.

Ain't it Cool News called it "found footage done right... one of the most effective entries in the popular subgenre" while The Wrap named it a "Netflix Horror Gem", calling the film "one of the freshest entries in American possession horror". Nerdist and Dread Central both wrote mostly positive reviews for the film, with Dread Central commenting that while the film would not appeal to everyone, "if you're looking for a spooky little film that's free of pretension and sometimes logic and are into getting some quick shivers, you really cannot go wrong". In contrast, Bloody Disgusting panned the film, stating that it was unduly derivative of other similarly themed works to be truly effective and that other than a specific scene near the end, "the film brings nothing new to the table".

References

External links
 
 
 
 

2014 films
2014 horror films
American supernatural horror films
2010s French-language films
Films about Alzheimer's disease
Films about exorcism
Films set in 2013
Films set in 2014
Films set in Virginia
Found footage films
Films produced by Bryan Singer
2014 directorial debut films
2010s English-language films
2010s American films